Alamgir Khan may refer to:

 Alamgir Khan (activist), Pakistani activist
 Alamgir Khan (cricketer) born 1978, Pakistani cricketer
 Alamgir Khan (footballer) born 1991, Pakistani footballer
 Alamgir Khan (singer), an Indian playback singer
 Alamgir Khan Wazir (born 1996),  Pakistani politician and member of the Pashtun Tahafuz Movement